Hörður Sveinsson (born 24 March 1983) is an Icelandic football striker that plays for Njarðvík.

References

1983 births
Living people
Association football forwards
Hordur Sveinsson
Hordur Sveinsson
Hordur Sveinsson
Silkeborg IF players
Tromsø IL players
Hordur Sveinsson
Hordur Sveinsson
Hordur Sveinsson
Danish Superliga players
Eliteserien players
Hordur Sveinsson
Hordur Sveinsson
Expatriate men's footballers in Denmark
Hordur Sveinsson
Expatriate footballers in Norway
Hordur Sveinsson